The Mannlgrat is an east-facing ridge on the Hoher Göll in the Bavarian Alps rising above Obersalzberg near Berchtesgaden.

The ridge rises from a col separating it from a subpeak of the Hoher Göll, the Kehlstein, upon which the famous Kehlsteinhaus is located.  Served by a Klettersteig, the Mannlgrat is regarded as the easiest route to the Hoher Göll's summit.

References

Berchtesgaden Alps